Zora Bernice May Cross (18 May 1890 – 22 January 1964) was an Australian poet, best-selling novelist and journalist.

Life
Zora Bernice May Cross was born on 18 May 1890 at Eagle Farm, Brisbane, to Earnest William Cross and Mary Louisa Eliza Ann. Her father was a Sydney born accountant. Cross published and was known for her serialised novels, books of poems and children's verse and inherited her love for literature from both her parents. She was educated at Ipswich Girls' Grammar School, Burwood Public School, Sydney Girls' High School and then Sydney Teachers' College from 1909 to 1910. As a child Zora was a prolific contributor to the Children's Corner in the Australian Town and Country Journal, where she attracted the attention of the editor, writer Ethel Turner, who went on to be a significant friend and mentor throughout Zora's writing career.

Zora combined her teaching career with writing and acting, including tours with the Cherry Abraham's Comedy Costume Company in Queensland and with JC Williamson's theatre company. On 11 March 1911, she married fellow actor Stuart Smith but later refused to live with him. The marriage was dissolved on 10 September 1922. In September 1914 she gave birth to a son, Normand (later known as Teddy), at Lauriston Private Hospital, Mosman, but no father was listed on the birth certificate. She taught for three years and then worked as a journalist, for the Boomerang and subsequently as a freelance writer.

By this time Zora had formed a lasting relationship with the writer David McKee Wright, whom she married in 1923. They lived in the Blue Mountains village of Glenbrook where they had two daughters, Davidina and Maeve (known as April).

Cross Street in the Canberra suburb of Cook is named in her honour.

Work 
In 1916 Zora Cross submitted her first novel, on an aboriginal theme but the publisher refused to publish this work. That same year a book of poems, A Song of Mother Love, was published.

In 1917 Cross published Songs of Love and Life, some of which had already appeared in The Bulletin, which was highly influential in Australian culture and politics until after the First World War, and was then noted for its nationalist, pro-labour, and pro-republican writing. This book and her book of similar poems, The Lilt of Life in 1918, both published by Angus & Robertson, were an expression of her love for David McKee Wright. Songs of Love and Life attracted widespread attention because of its erotic content and sold out in three days.

In 1918 Zora also wrote the children's verse The City of Riddle-mee-ree (1918), and then the more sombre Elegy on an Australian Schoolboy (1921), in memory of her 19-year-old soldier brother, John Skyring Cross.

Her 1924 book Daughters of the Seven Mile illustrated her awareness of developing social and economic stresses in Australia.

Zora wrote about controversial subjects for the time such as sex, childbirth, Aboriginal communities and the effects of war on women who are left behind.

As Bernice May, Rosa Carmen and Daisy M, Zora contributed regularly in the 1930s to the Australian Women's Mirror. As Bernice May she wrote a significant series of interviews with contemporary Australian women writers.

In later years Zora drew on a lifetime interest in Ancient Rome and Julius Caesar. Her novel The Victor was serialised in the Sydney Morning Herald in 1933 and received favourable reviews.

Throughout her life Zora supported herself and her children by acting, teaching and as a freelance journalist. The Commonwealth Literary Fund, (precursor to the Australia Council for the Arts) prompted by the Fellowship of Australian Writers, awarded her a pension.

Bibliography

Novels

 Daughters of the Seven Mile, London: Hutchinson (1924)
 The Lute-Girl of Rainyvale, London: Hutchinson(1925)
 Sons of the Seven Mile, London: Hutchinson (1927)
Moonstone Luck, Sydney Morning Herald (1930)
 The Victor, Sydney Morning Herald (1933)
This Hectic Age, Sydney: London Book Co.(1944) also published as Night Side of Sydney

Poetry collections

 A Song of Mother Love (1916)
 Songs of Love and Life (1917)
 The Lilt of Life (1918)
 The City of Riddle-Me-Ree (1918)

Poetry 
Elegy on an Australian Schoolboy, Sydney: Angus & Robertson (1921)

Lyrics
Dream travel two-part song (1937)

Non-Fiction 
An Introduction to the Study of Australian Literature, Sydney: Teachers' College Press (1922)

References

External links
 

 Dorothy Green, 'Cross, Zora Bernice May (1890–1964)', Australian Dictionary of Biography, National Centre of Biography, Australian National University, http://adb.anu.edu.au/biography/cross-zora-bernice-may-5828/text9897, published first in hardcopy in Australian Dictionary of Biography, Volume 8, (MUP), 1981

1890 births
1964 deaths
20th-century Australian novelists
20th-century Australian women writers
Australian women poets
Australian women novelists
20th-century Australian poets
20th-century Australian journalists
People educated at Sydney Girls High School